An Esperanto manual alphabet is included as part of the Signuno project for manually coded Esperanto. Signuno is based on the signs of International Sign, but adapted to the grammatical system of Esperanto.

Letters
The letters are all to be signed upright with a straight wrist, so for example the G closely resembles D, as in the French manual alphabet. None of the letters involve motion, so J and Z are distinct from other alphabets: J uses the two little fingers, like a Cyrillic J; 
Z has the form of an ASL 3, which appears to be unique to Signuno. 

Other differences from the American manual alphabet are:

B is a flat hand. The thumb does not cross the palm.
D maintains a round bowl with the thumb and curled fingers to keep it distinct from G, as also in the French manual alphabet and very conservative American letter forms
F has the 'okay' handshape with the fingers spread
H has a shape that recalls a capital Latin H (pinkie and index finger), as in the French and Irish manual alphabets
P, being upright, is distinguished from K by touching the tips of the fingers and thumb together (like a French P without the motion)
Q, which does not occur in Esperanto, is the shape of an ASL 8 sign and of an Irish K
T has its international form, as in the Irish manual alphabet and across Asia, rather than the fig sign of ASL.

The diacritic letters Ĉ, Ĝ, Ĥ, Ĵ, Ŝ, Ŭ are sometimes derived from their base letters: 
Ĉ by touching the tips of the fingers and thumb of the C hand together (like a Chinese digit 7)
Ĝ by switching the extended finger of the G hand from the index finger to the thumb (like a French A or a thumb for hitchhiking)
Ĥ by extending the thumb of the H hand (like the ASL slang 'I love you' sign)
Ĵ has the form of a clawed Z (ASL '3' hand with bent fingers), as if it were a Slavic-style letter Ž (which has the same sound as Esperanto Ĵ)
Ŝ by opening the S hand into a '5' handshape, like SCH in the German manual alphabet
Ŭ as a W hand but with the three fingers together, as in a scout salute.

Digits
Unlike in Gestuno, Signuno digits are all made on a single hand. For 1 to 4, the fingers are extended from the index to the pinkie. Thus Signuno '3' looks like an ASL '6'. 5 is the international (and ASL) '5' hand. For 6 to 9, the fingers are extended from the pinkie to the thumb, skipping the middle finger so that 8 is the ASL '8'. Apart from facing inwards or (in the case of 0 and 10) to the side rather than outward as the letters do, they thus have the shapes of the Signuno letters O (0), G (1), V (2), W (3), [ASL 4] (4), Ŝ [ASL 5] (5), I (6), J (7), Q [ASL 8] (8), Ĥ (9).

10 is signed as the Roman numeral X. As in ASL, 100 and 1000 are signed as the Roman numerals C and M.

For hours and months, there are additional sign for 11 and 12, which have the shapes of the letters Ĝ (11) and L (12) but turned so the palm faces the signer.

When working in hexadecimal, the pattern can be extended to 13 and 14 (i.e., 13 in hex is a turned Z hand), while 15 (hexadecimal 'F') is a turned F hand.

Gallery
The images below for many of the digits are imprecise in that they should be signed with the wrist upright. In J the fingers should be separated, and in Ĉ and P the fingers are flat and parallel rather than bunched. 7 is missing, but is just a turned J. 10 is correct, but is seen from the signer's rather than the viewer's perspective.

References

Manual alphabet
Esperanto